Sphaeromorda nummata is a species of beetle in the genus Sphaeromorda of the family Mordellidae, which is part of the superfamily Tenebrionoidea. It was described in 1974 by Pankow.

References

Beetles described in 1974
Mordellidae